Wolvi is a rural locality in the Gympie Region, Queensland, Australia.

History 
The locality name Wolvi is derived from the Aboriginal word (Kabi language, Dulingbara dialect), wolvai or wollai, meaning a young kangaroo almost weaned.

In 1887,  of land were resumed from the Tagigan pastoral run. The land was offered for selection for the establishment of small farms on 17 April 1887.

Neusa Vale Provisional School opened on 14 August 1899. In 1906 it was renamed Wolvi Provisional School. On 1 January 1909 it became Wolvi State School.

St George's Anglican Church was dedicated on 28 April 1912. It was located just to the west of the Wolvi State School. Circa 1957 the building was sold for removal.

Wolvi East Provisional School opened on 27 August 1912 as a half-time school in conjunction with Beenam Range Provisional School (meaning that a single teacher was shared between the two schools). About 1915 or 1916 it became a full-time provisional school. In 1917 it was renamed Coondoo Provisional School. In 1933 it became Coondoo State School. It closed in 1968. It was located on the corner of Kin Kin Road and Stewart Road.

The Wolvi General Store opened just west of the school around 1994, but closed in June 2016.

Heritage listings 
Wolvi has the following heritage listings:

 Kin Kin Road: Wolvi Hall
 936 Kin Kin Road: Wolvi State School
 888 Kin Kin Road: Wolvi Sawmill

Education 
Wolvi State School is a government primary (Prep-6) school for boys and girls at 936 Kin Kin Road. In 2017, the school had an enrolment of 23 students with 2 teachers and 7 non-teaching staff (3 full-time equivalent).

References 

Gympie Region
Localities in Queensland